Darryl Terrence Byrd (born September 3, 1960) is a former American football linebacker who played three seasons with the Los Angeles Raiders of the National Football League. He played college football at the University of Illinois at Urbana–Champaign and attended James Logan High School in Union City, California. He was a member of the Los Angeles Raiders team that won Super Bowl XVIII.

External links
Just Sports Stats
Fanbase profile

Living people
1960 births
Players of American football from San Diego
American football linebackers
African-American players of American football
Illinois Fighting Illini football players
Los Angeles Raiders players
National Football League replacement players
21st-century African-American people
20th-century African-American sportspeople